Reiko Peter (born 31 March 1989 in Luzern) is a professional squash player who represents Switzerland. He reached a career-high world ranking of World No. 66 in January 2016.

References

External links 
 
 
 

Swiss male squash players
Living people
1989 births
Sportspeople from Lucerne